Bougouriba is one of the 45 provinces of Burkina Faso and is in Sud-Ouest Region. In 2019 the population of Bougouriba was 153,606. The capital of Bougouriba is Diébougou. The 127 km2 Bontioli Reserve is located in the province.

Bougouriba is divided into 5 departments:

See also:
Regions of Burkina Faso
Provinces of Burkina Faso
Communes of Burkina Faso

References 

 
Provinces of Burkina Faso